Bagmati Province, formerly Bagmati Pradesh, is one of the seven provinces of Nepal established by the country's new constitution of 20 September 2015, comprising thirteen districts, namely Bhaktapur, Chitwan, Dhading, Dolakha, Kathmandu, Kavrepalanchok, Lalitpur, Makwanpur, Nuwakot, Ramechhap, Rasuwa, Sindhuli and Sindhupalchok. There are many categorized monuments sites in Bagmati Province.

Lists per district of Bagmati Province 
 List of monuments in Bhaktapur District
 List of monuments in Chitwan District
 List of monuments in Dhading District
 List of monuments in Dolakha District
 List of monuments in Kathmandu District
 List of monuments in Kavrepalanchok District
 List of monuments in Lalitpur District
 List of monuments in Makwanpur District
 List of monuments in Nuwakot District
 List of monuments in Ramechhap District
 List of monuments in Rasuwa District
 List of monuments in Sindhuli District
 List of monuments in Sindhupalchok District

Additional lists – Inside Kathmandu Valley

Hanumandhoka Palace Area
 List of monuments in Kathmandu Hanumandhoka Palace Area (KHP)

Kathmandu Metropolis Area 
 List of monuments in Metropolis 1, Kathmandu
 List of monuments in Metropolis 2, Kathmandu
 List of monuments in Metropolis 3, Kathmandu
 List of monuments in Metropolis 4, Kathmandu
 List of monuments in Metropolis 5, Kathmandu
 List of monuments in Metropolis 6, Kathmandu
 List of monuments in Metropolis 7, Kathmandu
 List of monuments in Metropolis 8, Kathmandu
 List of monuments in Metropolis 9, Kathmandu
 List of monuments in Metropolis 10, Kathmandu
 List of monuments in Metropolis 11, Kathmandu
 List of monuments in Metropolis 12, Kathmandu
 List of monuments in Metropolis 13, Kathmandu
 List of monuments in Metropolis 14, Kathmandu
 List of monuments in Metropolis 15, Kathmandu
 List of monuments in Metropolis 16, Kathmandu
 List of monuments in Metropolis 17, Kathmandu
 List of monuments in Metropolis 18, Kathmandu
 List of monuments in Metropolis 19, Kathmandu
 List of monuments in Metropolis 20, Kathmandu

Along Bagmati River in Kathmandu Valley
 List of monuments along Thapathali–Teku stretch of Bagmati River

Village areas in Kathmandu District
 List of monuments in Budanilkantha, Nepal
 List of monuments in Chandragiri, Nepal
 List of monuments in Dakshinkali, Nepal
 List of monuments in Kageshwari Manohara, Nepal
 List of monuments in Kirtipur, Nepal
 List of monuments in Shankharapur, Nepal
 List of monuments in Tarakeshwar, Nepal
 List of monuments in Tokha, Nepal
 List of monuments in Balambu, Nepal
 List of monuments in Bhutkhel, Nepal
 List of monuments in Budhanilakantha, Nepal
 List of monuments in Chalnakhel, Nepal
 List of monuments in Champadevi, Nepal
 List of monuments in Chhaimale, Nepal
 List of monuments in Chobhar Adinath, Nepal
 List of monuments in Danchhi, Nepal
 List of monuments in Dharmasthali, Nepal
 List of monuments in Futung, Nepal
 List of monuments in Gagalphedi, Nepal
 List of monuments in Goldhunga, Nepal
 List of monuments in Gongabu, Nepal
 List of monuments in Gothatar, Nepal
 List of monuments in Indraini, Nepal
 List of monuments in Jitpur, Nepal
 List of monuments in Kavresthali, Nepal
 List of monuments in Lapsiphedi, Nepal
 List of monuments in Machhenarayan, Nepal
 List of monuments in Manamaiju, Nepal
 List of monuments in Mulpani, Nepal
 List of monuments in Nanglebhare, Nepal
 List of monuments in Panga, Nepal
 List of monuments in Pukhalachi, Nepal
 List of monuments in Sangla, Nepal
 List of monuments in Satungal, Nepal
 List of monuments in Saukhel, Nepal
 List of monuments in Sunkot, Nepal
 List of monuments in Thankot, Nepal
 List of monuments in Tokha-Chandeshwori, Nepal
 List of monuments in Bajrayogini, Nepal

Bhaktapur Durbar Area
 List of monuments in Bhaktapur District

Lalitpur Durbar Area
 List of monuments in Lalitpur District

References 

Bagmati Pradesh